North Middlesex Regional High School is a public high school located in Townsend, Massachusetts, United States, in Middlesex County. It serves grades 912 primarily from Townsend, Pepperell, and Ashby. North Middlesex Regional High School has approximately 800 students.

According to the official North Middlesex Regional School District website, North Middlesex is a comprehensive school accredited by the New England Association of Secondary Schools and Colleges. The professional staff includes approximately seventy-five full-time teachers, a library/media coordinator, an academic support center coordinator, four guidance counselors, three school nurses, a school psychologist, approximately fifteen teaching assistants, two assistant principals, one principal, and a resource officer.

History

The school was built in 1957–1959 and an addition was added in 1972. The citizens of the neighboring town of Mason, New Hampshire expressed an interest in possibly joining the North Middlesex District in 2006. However, the choice was voted down by New Ipswich and other members of Mason's current school district.

In 2014 the towns of Pepperell, Ashby and Townsend voted for the construction of a new building, which opened for the 2017 school year. Prior to its first day in use, a bomb threat was received, necessitating the presence of the Townsend, MA police department with metal detectors. The adjacent older school's demolition was started in the fall of 2017.  The older school was completely demolished in the summer of 2018. The school has also received a new track and turf field, which was completed in June 2019.

The school was temporarily shut down in March 2020 due to the threat of COVID-19. North Middlesex re-opened in September 2020 after Charlie Baker allowed for schools to host in-person classes.

Extracurricular activities

There are three vocal performing ensembles at North Middlesex. There are five instrumental performing ensembles, including the wind symphony, concert band, jazz band, marching band, and winter percussion ensemble. The North Middlesex Tri-M Music Honor Society students also run Stars@Symphony, a two-day event that takes place at Mechanics Hall (Worcester, MA) and Symphony Hall (Boston, MA) which showcases bands that receive gold medal ratings from the Massachusetts Instrumental and Choral Conductors Association.

North Middlesex offers several service opportunities including New Orleans Service Learning and New York Service Learning. Both groups doing service in their respective cities. New Orleans Service Learning is often regarded as the most prestigious of the two with limited space and a competitive applications process.

North Middlesex also offers Relay For Life, Model UN and Giving Tree.

Athletics 

North Middlesex Regional High School hosts many athletic teams which compete in the Midland Wachusett league(Mid-Wach).

Fall
Football
Boys Soccer
Girls Soccer
Boys and Girls Cross Country
Unified Cross Country
Field Hockey
Golf
Girls Volleyball 
Cheerleading
Unified Basketball
Winter
Boys Basketball
Girls Basketball
Boys Ice Hockey
Indoor Track and Field 
Girls Ice Hockey (Co-op with Leominster )
Swimming (Co-op with Leominster High School)
Wrestling
Gymnastics (Co-op with Groton-Dunstable)
Alpine Ski (Co-op with Bromfield)
Spring
Baseball
Softball
Track and Field
Unified Track
Boys Lacrosse
Girls Lacrosse
Girls Tennis
Boys Tennis

References

Schools in Middlesex County, Massachusetts
Public high schools in Massachusetts